Wayne is an American action comedy streaming television series created by Shawn Simmons that premiered on January 16, 2019, on YouTube Premium. The series stars Mark McKenna, Ciara Bravo, and Joshua J. Williams and it follows a teenage boy who sets out to retrieve his late father's stolen car with the help of a girl he has a crush on.

On August 16, 2019, the series was cancelled after one season. The first season was added to Amazon Prime Video on November 6, 2020.

Premise
Wayne starts in Brockton, Massachusetts in present day. The titular character "sets out on a dirt bike with his new crush Del to take back the 1979 Pontiac Trans Am that was stolen from his father before he died." The car is in Ocala, Florida. Wayne, Del, and a host of oddball characters go on a road trip to get it back. "It is Wayne and Del against the world."

Cast and characters

Main
 Mark McKenna as Wayne McCullough Jr., a teenage boy who attempts to retrieve his late father's stolen car.
 Ciara Bravo as Delilah "Del" Luccetti, a girl from Brockton for whom Wayne develops feelings.

Recurring

 Stephen Kearin as Sergeant Stephen Geller
 James Earl as Officer Jay Ganetti, aka "Cop a' Soup"
 Dean Winters as Bobby Luccetti, Del's father
 Jon Champagne as Carl Lucetti, Del's brother
 Jamie Champagne as Teddy Lucetti, Del's brother
 Mike O'Malley as Principal Tom Cole from Hagler High
 Joshua J. Williams as Orlando Hikes, Wayne's best friend
 Francesco Antonio as Reggie, Wayne's stepbrother
 Kirk Ward as Calvin Clay, Wayne's stepfather
 Michaela Watkins as Maureen McNulty, Wayne's mother
 Sean Patrick Dolan as Darren
 Thomas Mitchell Barnet as Scott
 Patrick Gallagher as Mr. Hernandez, Wayne's landlord
 Maxwell McCabe-Lokos as Eric
 Zoé De Grand'Maison as Jenny
 Odessa Adlon as Trish
 Akiel Julien as Gill
 Jack Foley as Orande
 Harrison Tanner as Stick

Guest

"Chapter One: Get Some Then"
 Ray McKinnon as Wayne McCullough Sr., Wayne's father

"Chapter Two: No Priests"
 Janet Porter as Tracey
 Nick Serino as Jamie
 Tiio Horn as Kyra

"Chapter Three: The Goddamned Beacon of Truth"
 Torri Webster as Emma

"Chapter Five: Del"
 Abigail Spencer as Donna Luccetti, Del's late mother

"Chapter Six: Who Even Are We Now?"
 Ernie Grunwald as Vice Principal Walsh from Alabaster High in Richmond Hill, Georgia
 Bill Lake as Sheriff

"Chapter Seven: It'll Last Forever"
 Peyton Meyer as Bradley

"Chapter Eight: Musta Burned Like Hell"
 Pedro Miguel Arce as Cashier

"Chapter Ten: Buckle the F**k Up"
 Derek Theler as Conan the Barbarian
 Kevin Hanchard as Sergeant Randall

Episodes

Production

Development
On December 7, 2017, it was announced that YouTube had given the production a pilot order. The series was created by Shawn Simmons and will be executive produced by Rhett Reese, Paul Wernick, Greg Coolidge, and Kirk Ward. The pilot episode was set to be written by Simmons and directed by Iain B. MacDonald. Production companies involved with the series were slated to consist of Endeavor Content.

On April 23, 2018, it was announced that YouTube had given the production a series order for a first season consisting of ten episodes. On November 19, 2018, it was announced that the series would premiere on January 16, 2019.

Casting
Alongside the pilot order announcement, it was confirmed that Mark McKenna and Ciara Bravo would star in the series. Alongside the announcement of the series order, it was reported that Joshua J. Williams had been cast in a recurring role and that Dean Winters and Mike O'Malley would make guest appearances in the pilot episode.

Filming
Principal photography for the pilot episode took place in Ontario, Canada, and lasted until December 12, 2017. Filming for the rest of the series began on June 11, 2018, in Toronto, Ontario, Canada, and was scheduled to last until August 16, 2018.

Release

Marketing
On September 21, 2018, a teaser trailer for the series was released. On November 19, 2018, the official trailer for the series was released.

Premiere
On September 23, 2018, the series held its world premiere during the second annual Tribeca TV Festival in New York City. Following the screening, a conversation was held featuring members of the cast and crew, including creator Shawn Simmons, actors Mark McKenna and Ciara Bravo, director Iain B. MacDonald, and writers and executive producers Greg Coolidge, Kirk Ward, Rhett Reese, and Paul Wernick.

Reception

Critical response
The series has been met with a positive response from critics since its premiere. On the review aggregation website Rotten Tomatoes, the series holds a 100% approval rating with an average rating of 8/10 based on 13 reviews. The website's critical consensus reads, "The most thoughtfully violent series you'll see all year, Wayne is a home run."

In a positive review, IndieWires Ben Travers awarded the series a grade of "A−" and praised it saying, "Wayne may feel familiar to other stories, Bonnie and Clyde included. But Simmons' thoughtful, engrossing, and altogether joyful new series carves its own path on the cold roads of America’s eastern seaboard." In another encouraging criticism, Screen Rants Kevin Yeoman commended the series saying, "With its varying tones, stellar lead performances, and great supporting cast, Wayne is much more than the foul-mouthed action-comedy it makes itself out to be. The laughs may be pitch black at times, and the violence is occasionally shocking, but there’s a fascinating and entertaining sweetness woven into every scene that’ll hit you like a blast of rock salt to the heart." In an additional acclamatory critique, Rolling Stones Alan Sepinwall gave the series a rating of 3½ out of 5 stars and was similarly approving saying, "Both the show and Wayne’s attempts to right the world’s wrongs don’t always work, but they mean well and are rarely dull."

Viewership
Within five days of the series premiere, the first episode had accumulated over 10 million views.

References

External links
 Official YouTube Channel
 

2010s American comedy television series
2019 American television series debuts
2019 American television series endings
Action comedy web series
American action comedy television series
English-language television shows
Television series about teenagers
YouTube Premium original series
Television shows filmed in Toronto
Television shows set in Massachusetts
Television shows set in Florida